Kit Thomas (born May 25, 1947) is an American film maker and record producer best known for his involvement with films that "make a difference".

Life and career
As a filmmaker, Kit Thomas' projects have won numerous awards including two Emmys, and his film Burning Down Tomorrow, commissioned by rock musician Sting to raise awareness about the global rainforest crisis, was nominated for an Oscar (Best Documentary) in 1991. He co-produced the award-winning ECO (Earth Communication Office) PSA campaign which was adopted by the United Nations Environment Program and, according to a Pepperdine University study, has been seen by over one billion people worldwide, a world record for public service announcements. He was selected by the United Nations to co-produce their official 50th Anniversary film, entitled A Place To Stand, which has since been translated into many languages and remains one of the U.N.'s most requested films.

As a record producer, Thomas has produced over sixty albums of jazz, pop, and world music. He has been an active member of the National Academy of Recording Arts and Sciences since 1985, serving eight years on the Board of Governors, and twenty-five years as Chairman of a National Screening Committee for the Grammy Awards.

As a social activist and philanthropist, Thomas supports numerous charities, environmental initiatives and grass roots community organizations, including the Women's Earth Alliance, Global Green, the Jane Goodall Institute, Free the Slaves and MusiCares. In 2002 he founded the Common Ground Interfaith Forum in Philadelphia, to "support personal and social transformation, and build bridges of goodwill and understanding between people of different cultures and faith traditions." As Executive Director of Common Ground (2002–2008), Thomas established the Common Ground Choir, a performing ensemble of singers and musicians of diverse faiths and cultural backgrounds who celebrate a shared belief in the possibility of a less divided world.

Now retired and living in Santa Barbara, Thomas serves as Executive Director of The Circle of Wisdom (www.circleofwisdom.org), a non-profit digital library of video interviews with contemporary wisdom keepers and thought leaders representing diverse cultural and generational perspectives (www.circleofwisdom.org), and co-Director of the Shift Your World Film Festival (shiftyourworldfilmfestival.com).

References

Common Ground Fellowship article in Main Line Times (5/04)
[ Discography]

External links
 

1947 births
Living people
American filmmakers
American record producers
Place of birth missing (living people)